Min Phyu (1550s–1596) was a principal queen consort of King Nanda of Toungoo Dynasty of Myanmar (Burma) from 1583 to 1596. The eldest daughter of Viceroy Minkhaung II of Toungoo, along with her two younger sisters Min Htwe and Min Pu, married her first cousin Nanda in 1583. The marriages of state solidified the ties between Minkhaung II and Nanda, the High King.

Her official style, according to the Maha Yazawin and Hmannan Yazawin chronicles, was "Queen of the Southern Palace" although she was not the chief queen sort, making her one of the few Queens of the Southern Palace who was not also the chief queen. The Yazawin Thit chronicle demurs, conspicuously omitting her specific rank. At any rate, all three chronicles say that she was given a burial at Kanbawzathadi Palace, with the burial rites befitting a chief queen. She had no issue.

In popular culture 
She was portrayed as a character in Thai television drama many stories namely The Legend of King Naresuan: The Series Portrayed by Nussara Prawanna., and appeared in the scene of In Part 1 of the 2007 King Naresuan film series ,which she side seated of king Nanda Bayin.

Ancestry
The queen was descended from the Prome and ultimately Ava royalty from her mother's side. Her father Minkhaung was a half-brother of King Bayinnaung.

Notes

References

Bibliography
 
 
 

Queens consort of Toungoo dynasty
1550s births
1596 deaths
16th-century Burmese women